Phallus pygmaeus is a species of stinkhorn mushroom. It was found growing on rotten wood in the State of Pernambuco, Brazil, and first reported in 2003.

References

External links

Phallales